Joan Mascaró, generally known as Juan (8 December 1897 – 19 March 1987) was a Spanish translator. He used the Spanish spelling of his name (Juan) because the Catalan spelling (Joan) is the same as that of the female English name "Joan".

Biography
He was born in Santa Margarita, Majorca to a farming family and took interest in spirituality at the early age of 13. Mascaró is responsible for one of the most popular English translations of the Hindu text Bhagavad Gita (1962), and of some of the major Upanishads (1965). He also translated, from Pāli into English, a key Buddhist text, Dhammapada (1973). His first work, Lamps of Fire (1958), was a collection of religious and spiritual wisdom from across the world; a selection from the book inspired the Beatles song "The Inner Light" (1968). Though his native tongue was Catalan, he translated into English. Mascaró's obituary in The New York Times said he had, "achieved the unique feat of translation from languages not his own (Sanskrit and Pali) into another language not at first his own (English)."

His interest in religion started from the age of 13 when he studied a book on occultism. After finding this spiritually misleading, he discovered an older English translation of the Bhagavad Gita. This inspired him to study Sanskrit in order to gain a better understanding of the text, as the available translation was quite poor.

Mascaró studied modern and oriental languages at Cambridge University and spent some time lecturing on the Spanish Mystics. He then went to Ceylon where he was Vice-Principal of Parameshwara College at Jaffna. Later, he became Professor of English at the Autonomous University of Barcelona. He settled in England after the Spanish Civil War and there made his translations of the Bhagavad Gita and Upanishads, as well as returning to Cambridge University, where he was a supervisor of English and lectured on "Literary and Spiritual Values in the Authorized Version of the Bible." He was made doctor honoris causa by the University of the Balearic Islands. 

He married Kathleen Ellis in 1951 and had a twin son and daughter. He died in 1987 at his home in Comberton, Cambridge.

Bibliography

 Lamps of Fire/Lámparas de fuego (1958) .
 The Bhagavad Gita (1962) .
 The Upanishads (1965) .
 Dhammapada (1973) 
 The Creation of Faith (1993) .
 Himalayas of the Soul (1938) .
 A Star from the East, An Appreciation of Bhagavad Gita (1954).
 El ser y el amor (Ensayos sobre el Apocalipsis) (1973).
 Cartes d'un mestre a un amic (1993) .

References

External links

 Webpage devoted to Juan Mascaró at LletrA (UOC), Catalan Literature Online (Catalan)
 Margalida Munar. «La idea d'educació en l'obra de Joan Mascaró i Fornés.»,
 Climent Picornell. Joan Mascaró i Fornés i The Beatles (o George Harrison) http://jcmllonja.balearweb.net/post/112757 

1897 births
1987 deaths
People from Mallorca
Translators from Catalonia
Translators from Hindi
Translators from Pali
Translators from Sanskrit
Translators to English
Academic staff of the Autonomous University of Barcelona
Alumni of the University of Cambridge
20th-century translators
People from Comberton